Ksenia Pervak was the defending champion, but decided not to participate.

Irina-Camelia Begu won the title, defeating Donna Vekić in the final, 6–4, 6–4.

Seeds

Draw

Finals

Top half

Bottom half

Qualifying draw

Seeds

Qualifiers

Lucky loser 
  Monica Puig

Draw

First qualifier

Second qualifier

Third qualifier

Fourth qualifier

References 
 Main draw
 Qualifying draw

2012 WTA Tour
Singles